This is a list of the notable roles played by the French actress Sarah Bernhardt, including both stage roles and early motion pictures, with the year of the first performance. This list does not include one-time performances or revivals. Roles first performed by Bernhardt are noted as premieres.

Theatrical roles

1862–1869
1862
 Iphigénie by Racine, role of Iphigénia
 Valérie by Eugene Scribe, role of Valerie
 Les Femmes Savantes by Molière, role of Henriette
 L'Etourdi by Molière, role of Hippolyte
1864
 Le Père de la Debutante, by Emmanuel Théaulon and Jean-François Bayard, role of Anita
 Le Démon du Jeu, by Théodore  Barrière and Henri Crisafulli (premiere)
 Un Soufflet n'est Jamais Perdu
 La Maison sans Enfants by Dumanoir 
 L'Etourneau, by Baya and Laya 
 Le Premier Pas Labiche & Deslandes 
 Un Mari qui Lance sa Femme by Deslandes
1865
 La Biche aux Bois by the Coignard brothers, role of Princess Désirée
1866
 Le Jeu de l'Amour et du Hasard by  Pierre de Marivaux, role of Silvia
1867
 Les Femmes Savantes by Molière, role of Armande
 King Lear by William Shakespeare, role of Cordelia
 Athalie by Racine, role of Zarcharie
 Le Testament de César Girodot, by Bélot and Villetard, role of Hortense
 François le Champi by George Sand, role of Mariette
  Le Marquis de Villemer by George Sand,  role of Baronne d'Arglade
1868
 Kean by Alexander Dumas père, role of Anna Damby
 La Loterie du Marriage by Jules Barbier, role of Laure Dufour (premiere)
1869
 Le Passant by François Coppée , role of Zanetto (premiere)
 Le Bâtard by Alphonse Touroude, role of Jeanne  (premiere)

1870–1879
1870
 L'Affranchi by Latour de Saint-Ybars (premiere)
 L'Autre by George Sand, role of Hélène de Mérangis  (premiere)
1871
 Jeanne-Marie by André Theuriet, role of Thérése (premiere)
1872
 Mademoiselle Aïssé by Louis Bouilhet, role of Mlle. Aissé (premiere) 
  Ruy Blas by Victor Hugo, role of Doña Maria de Neubourg, Queen of Spain
 Mademoiselle de Belle-Isle  by Alexander Dumas, role of Gabrielle (premiere)
 Le Cid by Corneille, role of Chimène
  Britannicus by Racine, role of Juie
1873
 Le Mariage de Figaro by Pierre-Augustin Caron de Beaumarchais, role of Chérubin  
 Dalila by Octave Feuillet, role of Princess Falconieri
 L'Absent by Eugène Manuel, role of Mistress Douglas (premiere)
 Chez l'Avocat by Paul Ferrier, role of Marthe (premiere)
 Andromache by Racine, role of Andromache
 Phèdre by Racine, role of Aricie
1874
 Le Sphinx by Octave Feuillet, role of Berthe de Savigny (premiere)
 La Belle Paule by Louis Denayrousse, role of d'Henri de Ligniville (premiere) 
 Zaire by Voltaire, role of Zaire 
 Phèdre by Racine, role of Phèdre
1875
 La Fille de Roland by Henri de Bornier, role of Berthe 
 Gabrielle by Emile Augier, role of Gabrielle 
1876
 L'Étrangère by Alexandre Dumas, fils, role of Mrs. Clarkson
 La Nuit de Mai by Alfred de Musset, role of the Muse 
 Rome Vance by Alexandre Parodi, role of Posthumia (premiere)
1877
 Hernani by Victor Hugo, role of Doña Sol 
1878
 Othello by William Shakespeare, role of Desdemona 
 Amphytrion by Molière, role of Alcméne 
1879
 Mithradite by Racine, role of Monime

1880–1889
1880
 L'Aventurière by Emile Augier, role of Dona Clorinde
 Le Sphinx by Octave Feuillet, role of Blanche de Chelles  
 Adrienne Lecouvreur by Eugene Scribe and Ernest Legouvé, title role 
 Froufrou by Henri Meilhac and Ludovic Halévy, role of Gilberte  
 La Dame aux Camélias by, role of Marguerite Alexandre Dumas fils
1881
 La Princesse Georges, by Alexandre Dumas fils, role of Sévérine 
1882
Fédora by Victorien Sardou, role of Fédora (premiere) 
1883
Nana-Sahib by Jean Richepin, role of Djamma (premiere)
1884
 Macbeth by William Shakespeare, adaptation by Jean Richepin, role of Lady MacBeth
 Théodora by Victorien Sardou, role of Theodora, Empress of Byzantium (premiere)
1885
 Marion Delorme by Victor Hugo, role of Marion
1886
 Hamlet, by William Shakespeare, role of Ophelia 
 La Maitre des Forges by Georges Ohnet, role of Claire de Beaulieu
 L'Aveu by Sarah Bernhardt, one act, role of Comtesse Marthe de Rocca (premiere)
1887
 La Tosca by Victorien Sardou', role of Floria Tosca (premiere)
1888
 Francillon by Alexandre Dumas, fils, role of Francine de Riverolles
1889
 Léna by PIerre Berton, role of Léna Despart (premiere)

1890–1899
1890
 Jeanne d'Arc by Jules Barbier, incidental music by Charles Gounod role of Jeanne d'Arc 
 Cléopâtre by Victorien Sardou, role of Cleopatra (premiere)
1891
 Gringoie by de Banville, role of Gringoire 
1893
 Les Rois by Jules LeMaitre, role of Princess Wilhelmine (premiere)
1894
 Izéyl by Armand Silvestre and Eugène Morand, role of Izeyl  (premiere)
 La Femme de Claude, by Alexandre Dumas fils, role of Césarine
 Gismonda by Victorien Sardou, role of Gismonda (premiere)
1895
 Magda by Hermann Sudermann, role of Magda
 La Princesse Lointaine by Edmond Rostand, role of Mélissande (premiere)
1896 
 Lorenzaccio by Alfred de Musset, role of Lorenzaccio (premiere) 
1897
 Spiritisme by Victorien Sardou, role of Simone (premiere)
 La Samaritaine by Edmond Rostand, role of Photine
 Les Mauvais Bergers by Octave Mirbeau, role of Madeleine
1898
 La Ville Morte by Gabriele d'Annunzio, role of Anne (premiere)
 Lysiane by Romain Coolus, role of Lysiane (premiere)
 Médée by Catulle Mendès, role of Medea 
1899
 Hamlet by William Shakespeare, adapted by Marcel Schwob and Eugene Morand, role of Hamlet

1900–1909
1900
 L'Aiglon by Edmond Rostand, role of the Duc de Reichstadt (premiere)
 Cyrano de Bergerac by Edmond Rostand, role of Roxane
1901
 La Pluie et le beau Temps by Gozlan, role of the Baroness
 Les Precieuses Ridicules by Moliere, role of Madelon
1902
 Francesca da Rimini by Francis Marion Crawford and Schwob, role of Francesca
 Sapho by Alphonse Daudet, role of Fanny Legrand
  Théroigne de Méricourt by Paul Hervieu,  role of Théroigne (premiere)
1903
 Andromaque by Racine, role of Hermione, then the role of Andromaque
 Werther by Goethe, role of Werther (premiere)
 Plus que Reine by Emile de Bergerat, role of Joséphine de Beauharnais
 Jeanne Wedekind by Felix Philippi, adaptation by Luigi Krauss (premiere)
 La Sorcière by Victorien Sardou, role of Zoraya  (premiere)
1904
 Le Festin de la Mort by Boni de Castellane, role of Mme. Maujourdain (premiere)
 Varennes by Henri Lavedan and Georges LeNôtre, role of Marie Antoinette (premiere)
1905
 Angelo by Victor Hugo, role of Thisbé
 Esther by Racine, role of Assuerus
 Pelléas et Mélisande by Maurice Maeterlinck role of Pelléas
 Adrienne Lecouvreur adapted by Sarah Bernhardt, role of Adrienne
1906
 La Vierge d'Avila by Catulle Mendès, role of Saint Theresa
1907
 Les Bouffons by Miguel Zamacoïs, role of the hunchback Jacasse
  Le Vert-Galant by Émile Moreau, role of Queen Margot
  La Belle au Bois Dormant (Sleeping Beauty), adapted by Jean Richepin, role of Prince Charming
1908
 Le Courtisan e de Corinthe by Paul Bilhaud and Michel Carré, role of Cléonice (premiere)
1909
 La Nuit de Mai by Alfred de Musset, role of the poet 
 La Fille de Rubenstein by Remon
 Le Procès de Jeanne d'Arc by Émile Moreau, role of Jeanne d'Arc (premiere)

1910–1919
1910
 La Beffa by Sem Beneli, adapted by Jean Richepin, role of Gianetto Malespini
 La Femme X by Alexandre Bisson, role of Jacqueline Fleuriot
 Judas by John Wesley De Kay, role of Judas Iscariot (premiere)
1911
 Lucrèce Borgia by Victor Hugo, title role
1912
 La Reine Elizabeth by Emlie Moreau, title role (premiere) 
 Une nuit de Noel sous la Terreur by Maurice Bernhardt and Henri Cain, role of Marion (premiere)
1913
 Jeanne Foré, by Tristan Bernard, role of Jeanne (premiere)
1914
 Tout à coup by Paul de Cassagnac, role of the Marquis de Chalonne (premiere)
1915
 Les Cathédrales by Eugène Morand, role of Strasbourg Cathedral (one act - premiere) 
1916
 La Mort de Cléopatre by Maurice Bernhardt and Henri Cain (one act - premiere)
  l'Holocauste by Maurice Bernhardt, role of the Duchesse (one act - premiere)
 Au Champ d'Honneur , by Maurice Bernhardt and Henri Cain,  role of a soldier
 Vitrail by René Fauchois, role of Violaine (one act) 
 Hécube by Maurice Bernhardt and Chavance, role of Hécube (one act)
 Le Faux Modèle, Daurelly, role of Madeleine (one act)
 Le Marchand de Venise (The Merchant of Venice) (excerpts), role of Portia
 L'Etoile dans la nuit by Henri Cain, role of Jane de Mauduit (one act)
 Les Amours de la reine Élisabeth (as Queen Elizabeth)

1920–1923
1920
 Rossini by René Fauchois, role of Rossini's mother
 Athalie by Racine, role of Athalie
 Daniel by Louis Vernouil, role of Daniel Arnaud (premiere)
 Comment on écrit l'Histoire by Sacha Guitry, role of Mariette (one act- premiere) 
1921
 La Gloire by Maurice Rostand, role of La Gloire (one act, premiere) 
1922 
 Régine Armand by Louis Vernouil, role of  Régine Armand

Filmography

 1900: Le Duel d'Hamlet (Hamlet, as Hamlet) An excerpt from the play, featuring Bernhardt in a duel to the death with Laertes.
 1908: La Tosca (Tosca, as Tosca) A one-reel condensation of the play by the same name by Victorien Sardou.
 1911: La Dame aux Camélias (Lady of the Camelias – Camille, in the U.S. release, as Camille) A two-reel condensation of the play by the same name, and co-starring Lou Tellegen.
 1912: Adrienne Lecouvreur (An Actress's Romance; as Adrienne Lecouvreur) A two-reel condensation of the play by the same name. Co-starring Lou Tellegen.
 1912: Les Amours d'Elisabeth, Reine d'Angleterre (Queen Elizabeth; a major success) A four-reel condensation of the play of the same name. Co-starring Lou Tellegen.
 1912: Sarah Bernhardt à Belle-Isle (Sarah Bernhardt at Home, as herself) This documentary features Sarah at home with her family and friends, fishing for shrimp, and cuddling indoors with her pet dogs.
 1915: Ceux de Chez Nous (Those at Home: biographical, home movies) Among other celebrated persons of the era, there is a brief scene featuring Sarah sitting on a park bench and reading from a book.
 1916: Jeanne Doré (as Jeanne Doré). Based on a play of the same name. Bernhardt appears as a widowed mother, who lavishes attention on her son, Jacques. When he is seduced by a temptress and accidentally murders a man, she visits him in his cell on the night before his execution, pretending to be his fiancée.
 1917: Mères Françaises (Mothers of France), as Madame Jeanne D'Urbex, a war widow in World War I. When she learns that her son has also been wounded, she searches the battlefields, crawls through trenches, and finally reaches him at a medical station only to have him die in her arms. After this tragedy, she dedicates her life to helping others survive the ravages of war.

 1921: Daniel (five-minute death scene from the play of the same name) Bernhardt appears as a morphine addict in the hour before death.

 1923: La Voyante (The Fortune Teller) Bernhardt appears as a clairvoyant, who makes predictions that influence the outcome of national events. This film was Bernhardt's final performance, and was made while she was mortally ill. It was eventually completed with scenes made with a stand-in performing Bernhardt's character with her back turned to the camera.

References

Bibliography

External links

 The Sarah Bernhardt Pages
 
 
 Performances in Theatre Archive University of Bristol
 
 Sarah Bernhardt Collection at the Harry Ransom Center at the University of Texas at Austin.
 Bibliography
 Sarah Bernhardt Jewish Women's Archive
 Elie Edson press files on Sarah Bernhardt, 1910–1911, held by the Billy Rose Theatre Division, New York Public Library for the Performing Arts

Actress filmographies
French filmographies